Coliseo El Pueblo (English: Coliseum of the People) is an indoor sporting arena located in Cali, Colombia. Opened in 1971 for the 1971 Pan American Games, the capacity of the arena was, before it became a 12,000-capacity all-seater, 18,000.

It was designed by Colombian architect Pedro Enrique Richardson from the Richardson and Yusti studio (together with Libia Yusti). The calculation of structures was carried out by Harold Arzayuz.

Events
On 2 September 1977, Colombian boxer José Cervantes (Kid Pambele's brother) out-pointed future world champion Jorge Luján of Panama in one of the few boxing matches held here.

The arena has hosted some world championships of indoor sports, most notably the 1982 FIBA World Championship and the 2016 FIFA Futsal World Cup.

It is also used for concerts, with the likes of Santana, Jowell & Randy, Ñejo & Dalmata, Yomo and Eloy, among others, having performed here.

See also
Velódromo Alcides Nieto Patiño

References

External links

Sports venues completed in 1971
Indoor arenas in Colombia
Buildings and structures in Cali
Basketball venues in Colombia